The Tasmanian Achiever II is a cargo ship owned by Toll Shipping in Australia. It is primarily used on Bass Strait between Melbourne and Burnie. It replaced the Tasmanian Achiever. Along with its sister ship Victorian Reliance II, it was the largest cargo ship registered in Australia when introduced in March 2019.

References

Container ships
Ro-ro ships
Ships built in Nanjing
Toll Group
2018 ships